Tomáš Kučera (born 8 August 1948 in Jablonec nad Nisou) was Czechoslovak nordic combined skier who competed in the late 1960s and early 1970s. Competing in two Winter Olympics in the Nordic combined event, he finished fourth in the 1968 event and sixth in the 1972 event.

He is father of another Czech skier Milan Kučera.

Notes

External links
 Profile at Sports-Reference.com
 

Nordic combined skiers at the 1968 Winter Olympics
Nordic combined skiers at the 1972 Winter Olympics
Czech male Nordic combined skiers
Olympic Nordic combined skiers of Czechoslovakia
Living people
1948 births
Sportspeople from Jablonec nad Nisou